Rafael Jiménez (1914 – 1985) was a Spanish water polo player. He competed in the men's tournament at the 1928 Summer Olympics.

References

1914 births
1985 deaths
Spanish male water polo players
Olympic water polo players of Spain
Water polo players at the 1928 Summer Olympics
Water polo players from Barcelona